4 Draconis, also known as HR 4765 and CQ Draconis, is a star about 570 light years from the Earth, in the constellation Draco. It is a 5th magnitude star, so it will be faintly visible to the naked eye of an observer far from city lights. It is a variable star, whose brightness varies slightly from 4.90 to 5.12 over a period of 4.66 years.

In 1967, Olin Eggen discovered that 4 Draconis is a variable star, during a multicolor photometric survey of red stars. In 1973 it was given the variable star designation CQ Draconis.

Until the year 1985, 4 Draconis was thought to be a normal red giant star. In 1985, Dieter Reimers announced that the International Ultraviolet Explorer had detected a hot companion to the red giant, which itself appeared to be a binary cataclysmic variable star, making the complete system a triple star. However a 2003 study by Peter Wheatley et al., who examined ROSAT X-ray data for the star, concluded that the hot companion was more apt to be a single white dwarf, rather than a binary, and that the white dwarf is accreting material from the red giant. There does not yet appear to be a consensus about the multiplicity; some later studies consider 4 Draconis to be a binary, and some a triple.

In 1987, Alexander Brown announced that 6 cm wavelength radio emission had been detected by the Very Large Array. The strength of the radio emission was variable on a timescale of weeks to months.

It is possible that an outburst of 4 Draconis was the "guest star" reported by Chinese astronomers in the year 369 CE, in the constellation Zigong.

References

Draco (constellation)
060998
108907
Draconis, CQ
Z Andromedae variables
Draconis, 4
M-type giants